"Take Off" is a song by American hip hop recording artist Young Dro, released as a single on March 17, 2009. The song was initially meant to be first single from second studio album, then-titled P.O.L.O. (Players Only Live Once). The song, produced by Beat Billionaire, features fellow American rapper and Dro's former protege Yung L.A. The song was leaked on November 11, 2008, but was officially released on iTunes on March 17, 2009.

Music video
The music video was filmed in Atlanta on April 3, 2009. It was directed by Gabriel Hart. There are cameo appearances from Big Kuntry King, T.I., J-Money, DJ Drama and more. It appeared as the New Joint of The Day on 106 & Park, on May 14.

Charts

References

External links
Young Dro ft. Yung L.A. - Take Off Music Video

2009 singles
Young Dro songs
Grand Hustle Records singles
Music videos directed by Gabriel Hart
Atlantic Records singles
2009 songs